Elpis Israel - An Exposition of the Kingdom of God (commonly called Elpis Israel (English transliteration of Greek for "the hope of Israel", taken from Acts 28:20)) is a theological book written by John Thomas, founder of the Christadelphians, in 1848-1849 and published in 1849.

The book was based on a series of lectures given by Thomas in 1848 and is written in three parts, The Rudiments Of The World, The Things Of The Kingdom Of God And Of Jesus Christ and The Kingdoms Of The World In Their Relation To The Kingdom Of God. Thomas did not see, nor do the Christadelphians see, the book as inspired by God, but rather a deep and accurate study of The Bible. It is nevertheless widely read amongst Christadelphian believers and whilst not being the foundation for, does contains some of their core beliefs.

There have been fifteen editions of the book, although most were revisions. Four editions were published during the lifetime of Thomas: in 2000 by The Christadelphian Magazine & Publishing Association Ltd.; a reprinting by Logos Publications in January 2000; a reprint in April 2009 of the Fourth Edition--the latter was the last edited by John Thomas just prior to his death.

References

External links
 Elpis Israel - online text (15th edition).
  Elpis Israel - online text (1st edition).
 Elpis Israel - Spanish translation (14th edition).

1849 non-fiction books
19th-century Christian texts
Christadelphian books
1849 in Christianity
Theological views of individuals
Religious studies journals
19th-century books